Bogdan Ilić (born 16 September 1996), better known as Baka Prase, is a Serbian YouTuber, internet personality, rapper, gamer, actor and entertainer. He is also the founder of the Serbian brand known as ŠAIM SE. Ilić's YouTube channel name comes from the preschool cartoon Peppa Pig.

Early life 
Ilić was born on September 16, 1996 in Vranje, Serbia, FR Yugoslavia. His father Nenad Ilić is a priest, director, writer, and the Elder of the St. Nicholas Temple in Amsterdam. His mother Anastasija-Vesna Ilić is an actress and a writer. Prase is the third child, he has an older brother Pavle, older sister Jelisaveta and a younger sister Natalija.
As a child, his father took him to church every Sunday morning until Prase became older and stopped wanting to go, which his father accepted. Prase completed elementary and secondary music school, but was rejected by the Musical Academy he was applying for. He worked as a storage worker before turning to YouTube.

Career 
Neither of Ilić's parents supported his work when he began to work on YouTube. He created his YouTube account in 2011 and uploaded his first video in 2016. Ilić started off playing League of Legends professionally for teams KlikTech and Fortuna. In 2015, he became the world champion in eSports within the Serbian gaming committee.

In 2018, Ilić released his first music album called Institucija. He also created his own gaming club and named it after the album. When the club opened over 500 teenagers and children came to it.

Ilić performed at the Balkan Tube Festival in Banja Luka in 2018 with other YouTube stars. In the same year, Ilić performed at the Nikola Pasić's ice skating park in Belgrade, with Neverne Bebe and Lena Kovačević. He also performed in Novi Sad in 2019, where too many children came to the event and the audience needed to be evacuated.

Ilić was invited to the FanPit Festival in Zagreb, Croatia, where he recorded a video with KSI. He starred in the 2019 movie Ideš? Idem! alongside other YouTube stars. Prase went to Kosovo with his father, where he performed on stage, and together they recorded videos about Serbian monasteries and spoke about their values. He also donated money to the Red Star Rowing Club for their trip to the 2020 European Rowing Championships.

Prase performed at the concert "Born in Ghetto", inside Mirza Delibašić Hall, located in Sarajevo, Bosnia and Herzegovina, along with Jala Brat, Buba Corelli, RAF Camora, Coby, Goga Sekulić, and others. He was also featured on Serbian television quiz show TV Slagalica in the Associations game as one of the answers; the final answer was "Pig", and the answer to the column B was "Grandma".

In 2020, Ilić is returning to play in the Esports Balkan League with his own team named "Šaim se". He also began advertising his brand all over Belgrade's billboards. People believe that he plans to become a candidate for the 2020 Serbian parliamentary election. Nebojša Krstić said that Prase could have more votes then Serbian unions. Ljubiša Preletačević is denying the theories.

In December 2022, Ilić began his own Serbian fast food chain by the name "Kod Bake".

Controversies

Events 
In 2017, Ilić reacted to a video of a 12-year-old girl that had love problems, culminating in another YouTuber known as Amir Hadžić responding, criticizing Ilić for mocking the girl, which afterwards attempted suicide. In 2018, Ilić criticized a song, created by fellow YouTubers which are sisters known as "Andjela & Nadja", which escalated in the father of Anđela and Nađa, responding and criticizing Ilić for being disrespectful.

In 2019, Ilić reacted to a "diss-track" about him from other Serbian Youtubers, culminating in releasing diss-tracks between him and K1KA, another Serbian YouTuber and Twitch Streamer. Both of whom ended up together on a morning television program. In December 2021, after K1KA committed suicide, Ilić was brought in for questioning. Following the incident, Ilić had moved to Amsterdam, Netherlands, together with his partner, where he purchased a flat in order to join the rest of his family. Ilić had stated that he had resolved on this decision following the outcry of the Serbian public following Đukić's suicide, claiming that the situation had escalated to the point where he had received serious death threats. He had further announced that he will most likely cease streaming on YouTube, stating that doing streaming was too time-consuming and that it was not as profitable anymore.

In 2020, Serbian rapper Voyage, released his opinion that Serbian Youtubers are not in the same rank as Serbian musicians, after which Prase decided to create videos and a diss-track against Voyage's claims. During an interview in 2020, Jelena Karleuša admonished Youtubers (including Prase) for gaining fame undeservedly and shutting out "talented singers" from becoming famous. Prase and Karleuša exchanged response videos criticizing the other. Another Serbian folk singer, Aca Lukas, was asked in an interview what his opinion on Prase was and he criticized Prase, saying that he never heard of him or his work.

Croatian YouTube influencer Filip Rožman, better known as KakoLako, created a 37 minutes long video called "Drama Salama - Baka Prase", in which he is criticizing Ilić on a wide variety of topics including his music career and for being a hypocrite. Despite talking about it and partially addressing it, Baka Prase did not want to name the video directly outside one of his streams, possibly not wanting to risk exposing his fans to actual criticism of him. Serbian actor and politician Sergej Trifunović also criticized Ilić, responding to Twitter posts by Ilić. 

Ilić criticized English singers Dua Lipa and Rita Ora, both ethnic Kosovo Albanians, for Instagram posts regarding Kosovo being independent. 

After a long break, in September 2022 Ilić has a on-going controversy with the Serbian entrepreneur and CEO and founder of the Pink Media Group Željko Mitrović. Mitrović made a documentary film about Ilić. The controversy escalated in Ilić's primary, and secondary YouTube channels getting terminated from YouTube.

In January 2023, Ilić's restaurant got lit up on fire, by a pedestrian that threw molotov cocktail on it.

Allegations of child grooming 
On 4 July 2020, Ilić got accused of child grooming, to which Ilić responded explaining that he had a sexual intercourse with a 16-year-old girl, who told him that she was 18. Another girl started making TikTok & Twitter posts, where she exposes Ilić supposedly having sexual explicit chats with minors, to which Ilić responded that most of them faked or never told their ages, and that one of the chats was fabricated, and that he is making a criminal complaint over the false claim. Because of the claims, Ilić's sponsors dropped him. The allegations motivated Ilić to make a music video for the song named "Lična", which got age-restricted, and taken down from the Serbian YouTube trending list for being too explicit.  On Twitter, a video appeared of Ilić supposedly possessing cocaine during the creation of the music video, to which Ilić responded that it was just rice. The cocaine allegations escalated in Ilić making a YouTube video, defending himself regarding the rumors. Because of the allegations, Ilić revealed that he would take a break from YouTube.

Personal life 
Ilić made numerous videos on YouTube, claiming that he was in love with Serbian singer Sara Jo, they met once in Belgrade where Ilić asked her out and she declined. In an interview, she was asked about Ilić, and she said that her song "Nemam vremena za to"  fits her opinion on Ilić, which motivated Ilić to create a song dedicated to her known as "Imam vremena za to" . In 2020, Ilić stopped uploading regularly videos to his YouTube channel, revealing on his Instagram account that he was having tonsillectomy on February 20, 2020. Ilić was in a open-relationship with another Serbian YouTube influencer, and internet personality known as Anja Bla, after they have broken up in January, 2022.

Filmography

Film

Discography

Albums 
 Institucija (2018)

Singles

2018 
 "Hej Hej!" 
 "Šaim Se" 
 "Pariz" 
 "Godina" 
 "Autotune" 
 "Hasl" (with Choda)

2019 
 "Paketići" (with Choda) 
 "Balkanska Scena 2" (with Lazić)
 "Drug"
 "Ono Moje"
 "Poni"
 "Vesti"
 "Imam Vremena Za To"
 "Jel Te Nije Blam"

2020 
 "Blamage"
 "Korona"
 "Sve Vas Volim"
 "Macan"
 "Lična"
 "Ona Ona"
"Dubai"

2021 
 "Zovi Tatu"
 "Obi"

2022 
 "Tokyo"

Awards and nominations

References

External links 

 
 

1996 births
Living people
Musicians from Belgrade
Serbian rappers
21st-century Serbian male actors
Serbian male voice actors
Serbian male film actors
Serbian record producers
Serbian hip hop musicians
YouTube channels launched in 2011
Gaming YouTubers
YouTube controversies
Comedy YouTubers
Music YouTubers
Serbian YouTubers